This list includes well known paradoxes, grouped thematically. The grouping is approximate, as paradoxes may fit into more than one category. This list collects only scenarios that have been called a paradox by at least one source and have their own article in this encyclopedia. Although considered paradoxes, some of these are simply based on fallacious reasoning (falsidical), or an unintuitive solution (veridical). Informally, the term paradox is often used to describe a counter-intuitive result.

However, some of these paradoxes qualify to fit into the mainstream perception of a paradox, which is a self-contradictory result gained even while properly applying accepted ways of reasoning. These paradoxes, often called antinomy, point out genuine problems in our understanding of the ideas of truth and description.

Logic 

 : The supposition that, 'if one of two simultaneous assumptions leads to a contradiction, the other assumption is also disproved' leads to paradoxical consequences. Not to be confused with the Barber paradox.
 : If a presumption needs to be made that a specific result can be deduced from premises, then the result can never be deduced. An inference rule, which is valid (or not), cannot be a premise, which is true (or false), otherwise one has an infinite regress. Also known as Carroll's paradox and is not to be confused with the "Achilles and the tortoise" paradox by Zeno of Elea.
 : A situation in which someone is in need of something that can only be had by not being in need of it. A soldier who wants to be declared insane to avoid combat is deemed not insane for that very reason and will therefore not be declared insane.
 : In any pub there is a customer such that if that customer is drinking, everybody in the pub is drinking.
 : Disjunction introduction poses a problem for modal inferences, permitting arbitrary modal statements to be inferred.
 : Inconsistent premises always make an argument valid.
 : If there is one winning ticket in a large lottery, it is reasonable to believe of any particular lottery ticket that it is not the winning ticket, but it is not reasonable to believe that no lottery ticket will win.
 : (or Hempel's Ravens): Observing a green apple increases the likelihood of all ravens being black.
 : Disjunction introduction poses a problem for imperative inference by seemingly permitting arbitrary imperatives to be inferred.
 : The day of the hanging will be a surprise, so it cannot happen at all, so it will be a surprise. The surprise examination and Bottle Imp paradox use similar logic.
 : If the temperature is 90 and the temperature is rising, that would seem to entail that 90 is rising.

Self–reference 
These paradoxes have in common a contradiction arising from either self-reference or circular reference, in which several statements refer to each other in a way that following some of the references leads back to the starting point.

 : A male barber shaves all and only those men who do not shave themselves. Does he shave himself? (Russell's popularization of his set theoretic paradox.)
 : The thesis that there are some things which are unnameable conflicts with the notion that something is named by calling it unnameable.
 : The phrase "the first number not nameable in under ten words" appears to name it in nine words.
 : If a crocodile steals a child and promises its return if the father can correctly guess exactly what the crocodile will do, how should the crocodile respond in the case that the father guesses that the child will not be returned?
 : A law student agrees to pay his teacher after (and only after) winning his first case. The teacher then sues the student (who has not yet won a case) for payment.
 : "If this sentence is true, then Germany borders China."
 : A Cretan says: "All Cretans are liars". This paradox works in mainly the same way as the liar paradox.
 : Is the word "heterological", meaning "not applicable to itself", a heterological word? (A close relative of Russell's paradox.)
 : If there was a name for a natural number that is identical to a name of the successor of that number, there would be a natural number equal to its successor.
 : By formulating an equivalent to Richard's paradox, untyped lambda calculus is shown to be inconsistent.
 : "This sentence is not known."
 : "This sentence is false." This is the canonical self-referential paradox. Also "Is the answer to this question 'no'?", and "I'm lying."
: "The next statement is true. The previous statement is false." A variant of the liar paradox in which neither of the sentences employs (direct) self-reference, instead this is a case of circular reference.
 : Two sentences that each say the other is not true.
 : What would happen if Pinocchio said "My nose grows now"?
 : "'Yields a falsehood when appended to its own quotation' yields a falsehood when appended to its own quotation." Shows that a sentence can be paradoxical even if it is not self-referring and does not use demonstratives or indexicals.
 : An ordered infinite sequence of sentences, each of which says that all following sentences are false. While constructed to avoid self-reference, there is no consensus whether it relies on self-reference or not.
 : "It is opposite day today." Therefore, it is not opposite day, but if you say it is a normal day it would be considered a normal day, which contradicts the fact that it has previously been stated that it is an opposite day.
 : It initially appears as if we can quantify over absolutely everything (including the expression itself), but this generates the liar paradox.
 : We appear to be able to use simple English to define a decimal expansion in a way that is self-contradictory.
 : Does the set of all those sets that do not contain themselves contain itself?
 : Purportedly said by Socrates.

Vagueness 

 : It seems like one can replace any component of a ship, and it is still the same ship. So they can replace them all, one at a time, and it is still the same ship. However, they can then take all the original pieces, and assemble them into a ship. That, too, is the same ship they began with.
 See also 
  (also known as the paradox of the heap): If one removes a single grain of sand from a heap, they still have a heap. If they keep removing single grains, the heap will disappear. Can a single grain of sand make the difference between heap and non-heap?

Mathematics 

 : A fallacious argument by induction that appears to prove that all horses are the same color.
 : An ant crawling on a rubber rope can reach the end even when the rope stretches much faster than the ant can crawl.
 : The number of points of intersection of two higher-order curves can be greater than the number of arbitrary points needed to define one such curve.
 : Elevators can seem to be mostly going in one direction, as if they were being manufactured in the middle of the building and being disassembled on the roof and basement.
 : The first number that can be considered "dull" rather than "interesting" becomes interesting because of that fact.
 : If potatoes consisting of 99% water dry until they are 98% water, they lose 50% of their weight.
 : Does the set of all those sets that do not contain themselves contain itself?

Statistics 

 : Effect size may not be indicative of practical meaning.
 : Predictive models with a given level of accuracy may have greater predictive power than models with higher accuracy.
 : A complicating factor arising in statistical tests of proportions.
 : Describes a problem in model selection where predictor variables with no explanatory power can appear artificially important.
 : For almost everyone, their friends have more friends than they do.
 : (Bus waiting time paradox) For a given random distribution of bus arrivals, the average rider at a bus stop observes more delays than the average operator of the buses.
 : Tiny errors in the null hypothesis are magnified when large data sets are analyzed, leading to false but highly statistically significant results.
 : Low birth weight and mothers who smoke contribute to a higher mortality rate. Babies of smokers have lower average birth weight, but low birth weight babies born to smokers have a lower mortality rate than other low birth weight babies. This is a special case of Simpson's paradox.
 , or the : A trend that appears in different groups of data disappears when these groups are combined, and the reverse trend appears for the aggregate data.
 : The mathematical concept of an average, whether defined as the mean or median, leads to apparently paradoxical results—for example, it is possible that moving an entry from an encyclopedia to a dictionary would increase the average entry length on both books.

Probability 

 : A paradox of conditional probability closely related to the Boy or Girl paradox.
 : Different common-sense definitions of randomness give quite different results.
 : What is the chance that two people in a room have the same birthday?
 : Conditional probability density functions are not invariant under coordinate transformations.
 : A two-child family has at least one boy. What is the probability that it has a girl?
 : A test that is accurate the vast majority of the time could show you have a disease, but the probability that you actually have it could still be tiny.
 : Shows that the exact meaning of statements involving conditionals and probabilities is more complicated than may be obvious on casual examination.
 : One can have three dice, called A, B, and C, such that A is likely to win in a roll against B, B is likely to win in a roll against C, and C is likely to win in a roll against A.
 : An unintuitive consequence of conditional probability.
 : A wager between two people seems to favour them both. Very similar in essence to the Two-envelope paradox.
 : The Kelly criterion is an often optimal strategy for maximizing profit in the long run. Proebsting's paradox apparently shows that the Kelly criterion can lead to ruin.
 : A probability problem that can be correctly answered as one half or one third depending on how the question is approached.
 : When pulling a random card, how do you determine the color of the underside of the card? (A variation on the Bertrand's box paradox.)
 : A variation of the Monty Hall problem.
 : You are given two indistinguishable envelopes, each of which contains a positive sum of money. One envelope contains twice as much as the other. You may pick one envelope and keep whatever amount it contains. You pick one envelope at random but before you open it you are given the chance to take the other envelope instead.

Infinity and infinitesimals 

 : If the ordinal numbers formed a set, it would be an ordinal number that is smaller than itself.
 : The set of all sets would have its own power set as a subset, therefore its cardinality would be at least as great as that of its power set. But Cantor's theorem proves that power sets are strictly greater than the sets they are constructed from. Consequently, the set of all sets would contain a subset greater than itself.
 : Though most numbers are not squares, there are no more numbers than squares. (See also Cantor's diagonal argument)
 : If a hotel with infinitely many rooms is full, it can still take in more guests.
 : Countably infinite models of set theory contain sets that are uncountable in the sense of the model.
 : "You will never reach point B from point A as you must always get half-way there, and half of the half, and half of that half, and so on." (This is also a physical paradox.)
 Supertasks may result in paradoxes such as
 : Apparently, a man can be "forced to stay where he is by the mere unfulfilled intentions of the gods".
 : An infinite number of assassins can create an explicit self-contradiction by scheduling their assassinations at certain times.
 : The sum of 1−1+1−1+1−1... can be either one, zero, or one-half.
 : After alternately adding and removing balls to a vase infinitely often, how many balls remain?
 : After flicking a lamp on and off infinitely often, is it on or off?

Geometry and topology 

 : A ball can be cut into a finite number of pieces and re-assembling the pieces will get two balls, each of equal size to the first. The von Neumann paradox is a two-dimensional version.
 : A set that can be partitioned into two sets, each of which is equivalent to the original.
 : the perimeter of a landmass is in general ill-defined.
 : a coin rotating along the edge of an identical coin will make a full revolution after traversing only half of the stationary coin's circumference.
 : or : A simple object with finite volume but infinite surface area. Also, the Mandelbrot set and various other fractals are covered by a finite area, but have an infinite perimeter (in fact, there are no two distinct points on the boundary of the Mandelbrot set that can be reached from one another by moving a finite distance along that boundary, which also implies that in a sense you go no further if you walk "the wrong way" around the set to reach a nearby point).
 : There exists a countable subset C of the sphere S such that S\C is equidecomposable with two copies of itself.
 : An image with many pieces whose size is 32 m², but drops down to 30 m² when its pieces are rearranged
 : A set contained in and with the same Lebesgue measure as the unit square, yet for every one of its points there is a straight line intersecting the Nikodym set only in that point.
 : A sphere can, topologically, be turned inside out.

Decision theory 

 : People can make decisions based not on what they actually want to do, but on what they think that other people want to do, with the result that everybody decides to do something that nobody really wants to do, but only what they thought that everybody else wanted to do.
 : Some systems of apportioning representation can have unintuitive results due to rounding
 : Increasing the total number of seats might shrink one block's seats.
 : Adding a new state or voting block might increase the number of votes of another.
 : A fast-growing state can lose votes to a slow-growing state.
 : Given more than two choices, no system can have all the attributes of an ideal voting system at once.
 : How can a rational choice be made between two outcomes of equal value?
 : Even those who know better play the so-called chain store game in an irrational manner.
 : Selecting the best decision-making method is a decision problem in itself.
 : People exhibit ambiguity aversion (as distinct from risk aversion), in contradiction with expected utility theory.
 : The belief that people generally disapprove of the United States Congress as a whole, but support the Congressman from their own Congressional district.
 : The more similar two choices are, the more time a decision-making agent spends on deciding.
 : Policies intending to reduce future CO2 emissions may lead to increased emissions in the present.
 : Despite goodwill, human intimacy cannot occur without substantial mutual harm.
 : It is easier to solve a more general problem that covers the specifics of the sought-after solution.
 : Can one intend to drink the non-deadly toxin, if the intention is the only thing needed to get the reward?
Motivation crowding theory: Adding incentives for some behavior can sometimes backfire and actually result in less of that behavior.
 : a type of false dilemma in which contradictory observations lead to the same conclusion. 
 : Increased navigational precision may result in increased collision risk.
 : How do you play a game against an omniscient opponent?
 : Should one tolerate intolerance if intolerance would destroy the possibility of tolerance?
 : Also known as the Downs paradox. For a rational, self-interested voter the costs of voting will normally exceed the expected benefits, so why do people keep voting?
 : It is possible to play two losing games alternately to eventually win.
 : After preparing to avoid a catastrophe and lessening the damage, the perception regarding the catastrophe would be much less serious due to the limited damage caused after.
 : For one person to benefit, many people have to change their behavior – even though they receive no benefit, or even suffer, from the change.
 : Two people might not cooperate even if it is in both their best interests to do so.
 : Also known as Condorcet's paradox and paradox of voting. A group of separately rational individuals may have preferences that are irrational in the aggregate.
 : Those who keep their minds open are more goal-directed and more motivated than those who declare their objectives to themselves.

Physics 

 : A contradiction between modelled estimates of tropical temperatures during warm, ice-free periods of the Cretaceous and Eocene, and the lower temperatures that proxies suggest were present.
 : What would happen if an unstoppable force hit an immovable object?
 : If everything that exists has a place, that place must have a place, and so on ad infinitum.
 : When a grain of millet falls it makes no sound, but when a thousand grains fall they do, thus many of nothing become something.
 : Suppose two rows are moving past a stationary row in opposite directions. If a member of a moving row moves past a member of the stationary row in an indivisible instant of time, they move past two members of the row that is moving in the other direction in this instant of time.

Astrophysics 

 : In some binary star systems the partners seem to have different ages, even though they are thought to have formed at the same time.
 : The contradiction between existence of liquid water early in the Earth's history and the expectation that the output of the young Sun would have been insufficient to melt ice on Earth.
 : Extreme-energy cosmic rays (like the Oh-My-God particle and several others after it) have been observed that seem to violate the Greisen–Zatsepin–Kuzmin limit, which is a consequence of special relativity.
 : Compared to theory, there is an overabundance of young stars close to the supermassive black hole in the Galactic Center.
 : Why is the night sky dark if there is an infinity of stars, covering every part of the celestial sphere?

Classical mechanics 

 : If the tortoise is ahead of Achilles, by the time Achilles reaches the tortoise's current position, the tortoise will have moved a bit further ahead, which goes on indefinitely.
 : An archer must, in order to hit his target, not aim directly at it, but slightly to the side. Not to be confused with the arrow paradox.
  : If we divide time into discrete 0-duration slices, no motion is happening in each of them, so taking them all as a whole, motion is impossible.
 : A massive battleship can float in a few litres of water.
 : Rolling joined concentric wheels seem to trace the same distance with their circumferences, even though the circumferences are different.
 : The angular momentum of a stick should be zero, but is not.
 : Flow of an inviscid fluid produces no net force on a solid body.
: Based on the Navier–Stokes equations, one would expect the mass flux in a channel to decrease with increasing Knudsen number, but there is a distinct minimum around Knudsen number 0.8.
 : Surface-dwelling arthropods (such as the water strider) should not be able to propel themselves horizontally.
 : To reach its target, an airborne arrow must first reach an infinite number of midpoints between its current position and the target.
 : Even though hydrometers are used to measure fluid density, a hydrometer will not indicate changes of fluid density caused by changing atmospheric pressure.
 : Which way does a sprinkler rotate when submerged in a tank and made to suck in the surrounding fluid?
 : Are there non-deterministic systems in Newtonian mechanics?
 : Rigid-body dynamics with contact and friction is inconsistent.
 : When a cup of tea is stirred, the leaves assemble in the center, even though centrifugal force pushes them outward.
 : When a fluid is poured from a higher container onto a lower one, particles can climb up the falling water.

Cosmology 

 : In a Newtonian universe, gravitation should pull all matter into a single point.
 : If the universe we observe resulted from a random thermodynamic fluctuation, it would be vastly more likely to be a simple one than the complex one we observe. The simplest case would be just a brain floating in vacuum, having the thoughts and sensations an ostensible observer has.
 : If there are, as various arguments suggest, many other sentient species in the universe, then where are they? Should their presence not be obvious?
 : If the universe were infinitely old, it would be in thermodynamic equilibrium, which contradicts what we observe.
 : Why is the night sky dark if there is an infinity of stars, covering every part of the celestial sphere?

Electromagnetism 

 : An apparent violation of Faraday's law of electromagnetic induction.

Quantum mechanics 

 : A charged particle is affected by an electromagnetic field even though it has no local contact with that field.
 : Why do measured quantum particles not satisfy mathematical probability theory?
 : Matter and energy can act as a wave or as a particle depending on the experiment.
 : Can far away events influence each other in quantum mechanics?
 : In the small wavelength limit, the total scattering cross section of an impenetrable sphere is twice its geometrical cross-sectional area (which is the value obtained in classical mechanics).
 : How can we make inferences about past events that we haven't observed while at the same time acknowledge that the act of observing it affects the reality we are inferring to?
 : When the potential of a potential barrier becomes similar to the mass of the impinging particle, it becomes transparent.
 : Spherically symmetric wave functions, when observed, produce linear particle tracks.
 : (Turing paradox) echoing the Zeno paradox, a quantum particle that is continuously observed cannot change its state
 : According to the Copenhagen interpretation of quantum mechanics, a cat could be simultaneously alive and dead, as long as it remains unobserved.
 : There is a fundamental limit to the precision with which certain pairs of physical properties of a particle, known as complementary variables, such as position and momentum can be known. This is often confused with a similar effect in physics called the observer effect.

Relativity 

 : About the stress on a rope under the effects of length contraction.
 : Black holes violate a commonly assumed tenet of science that information cannot be destroyed.
 : On the kinematics of a rigid rotating disk.
 : Introductory relativity problem about a ladder, a barn, and simultaneity.
 : Which formula should be used to transform velocities between non-collinear reference frames in special relativity?
 : An accelerated charge should radiate, yet such radiation is not observed for stationary particles on gravitational fields.
 : The buoyancy of a relativistic object (such as a bullet) appears to change when the reference frame is changed from one in which the bullet is at rest to one in which the fluid is at rest.
 : Einstein's thought experiment about how faster-than-light communication could cause a causality paradox.
 : Does a torque arise in static systems when changing frames?
 : The theory of relativity predicts that a person making a round trip will return younger than their identical twin who stayed at home.

Thermodynamics 

 : In an ideal gas, is entropy an extensive variable?
 : Why is there an inevitable increase in entropy when the laws of physics are invariant under time reversal? The time reversal symmetry of physical laws appears to contradict the second law of thermodynamics.
 : The second law of thermodynamics seems to be violated by a cleverly operated trapdoor.
 : Hot water can, under certain conditions, freeze faster than cold water, even though it must pass the lower temperature on the way to freezing.

Biology 

 : In some areas of the oceans, phytoplankton concentrations are low despite there apparently being sufficient nutrients.
 : Genome size does not correlate with organismal complexity. For example, some unicellular organisms have genomes much larger than that of humans.
 : Even a tiny fecundity advantage of one additional offspring would favor the evolution of semelparity.
 : Despite their relatively small muscle mass, dolphins can swim at high speeds and obtain large accelerations.
 : Exposure to small doses of toxins can have beneficial effects.
 : Persistent female choice for particular male trait values should erode genetic variance in male traits and thereby remove the benefits of choice, yet choice persists.
 : When rising to stand from a sitting or squatting position, both the hamstrings and quadriceps contract at the same time, despite their being antagonists to each other.
 : Increasing the food available to an ecosystem may lead to instability, and even to extinction.
 : Applying pesticide to a pest may increase the pest's abundance.
 : Why are there so many different species of phytoplankton, even though competition for the same resources tends to reduce the number of species?
 : An anomalous pattern of inheritance in the fragile X syndrome.
 : The concept for a taxon can overlap in the past.
 : When did the ancestors of birds live?

Health and nutrition 
 : The observation that the French suffer a relatively low incidence of coronary heart disease, despite having a diet relatively rich in saturated fats, which are assumed to be the leading dietary cause of such disease.
 : The large amount of glycogen in the liver cannot be explained by its small glucose absorption.
 : The finding that Hispanics in the United States tend to have substantially better health than the average population in spite of what their aggregate socio-economic indicators predict.
 : The observation that Israelis suffer a relatively high incidence of coronary heart disease, despite having a diet very low in saturated fats, which are assumed to be the leading dietary cause of such disease.
 : Mexican children tend to have higher birth weights than can be expected from their socio-economic status.
 : In some medical conditions, obesity is associated with increased survival, although there is a strong association with shortened lifespan in the general population.
 : Humans and other small-to-medium-sized mammals get cancer with high frequency, while larger mammals, like whales, do not. If cancer is essentially a negative outcome lottery at the cell level, and larger organisms have more cells, and thus more potentially cancerous cell divisions, one would expect larger organisms to be more predisposed to cancer.
 : A pulsus paradoxus is an exaggerated decrease in systolic blood pressure during inspiration. It can indicate certain medical conditions in which there is reduced cardiac output, such as cardiac tamponade or constrictive pericarditis. Also known as the Pulse Paradox.
 : The "second wind" is a sudden period of increased wakefulness in individuals deprived of sleep that tends to coincide with the individual's circadian rhythm. Although the individual is more wakeful and aware of their surroundings, they are continuing to accrue sleep debt and thus, are actually exacerbating their sleep deprivation.

Chemistry 

 : Diluted nitric acid will corrode steel, while concentrated nitric acid will not.
 : The length of time that it takes for a protein chain to find its folded state is many orders of magnitude shorter than it would be if it freely searched all possible configurations.
 : Exceptions to the principle that a small change in a molecule causes a small change in its chemical behavior are frequently profound.

Time travel 

  (also ontological paradox): You send information/an object to your past self, but you only have that information/object because in the past, you received it from your future self. This means the information/object was never created, yet still exists.
: Someone travels back in time to discover the cause of a famous fire. While in the building where the fire started, they accidentally knock over a kerosene lantern and causes a fire, the same fire that would inspire them, years later, to travel back in time. The bootstrap paradox is closely tied to this, in which, as a result of time travel, information or objects appear to have no beginning.
 : What happens when a time traveler does things in the past that prevent them from doing them in the first place?
: If one travels back in time and kills their grandfather before he conceives one of their parents, which precludes their own conception and, therefore, they couldn't go back in time and kill their grandfather.
: A billiard ball can be thrown into a wormhole in such a way that it would emerge in the past and knock its incoming past self away from the wormhole entrance, creating a variant of the grandfather paradox.
: One can travel back in time and murder Adolf Hitler before he can instigate World War II and the Holocaust; but if he had never instigated that, then the murder removes any reason for the travel.

Linguistics and artificial intelligence 

 : Is a "historical linguist" a linguist who is historical, or someone who studies "historical linguistics"?
 : How can a language both enable communication and block communication?
 : Logical thought is hard for humans and easy for computers, but picking a screw from a box of screws is an unsolved problem.
 : In transformational linguistics, there are pairs of sentences in which the sentence without movement is ungrammatical while the sentence with movement is not.
 : In automated handwriting recognition, a cursively written word cannot be recognized without being segmented and cannot be segmented without being recognized.

Philosophy 

 : It seems that no conceptual analysis can meet the requirements both of correctness and of informativeness.
 : Plato says: "If your next statement is true, I will allow you to cross, but if it is false, I will throw you in the water." Socrates responds: "You will throw me in the water." Whatever Plato does, he will seemingly break his promise. Similar to the crocodile dilemma.
 : How can people experience strong emotions from purely fictional things?
 : If all truths are knowable, then all truths must in fact be known.
 : If God knows in advance what a person will decide, how can there be free will?
 : Why can induction be used to confirm that things are "green", but not to confirm that things are "grue"?
 : When one pursues happiness itself, one is miserable; but, when one pursues something else, one achieves happiness.
 : "Minimal Liberty" is incompatible with Pareto optimality.
 : (Learner's paradox) A man cannot search either for what he knows or for what he does not know.
 : (Parfit's paradox) Is a large population living a barely tolerable life better than a small, happy population?
 : "It's raining, but I don't believe that it is."
 : A paradoxical game between two players, one of whom can predict the actions of the other.
 : Several distinct paradoxes share this name.
 : Can an omnipotent being create a rock too heavy for itself to lift?
 : "We know more than we can tell", Polanyi's paradox brings to attention the cognitive phenomenon that there exist tasks which human beings understand intuitively how to perform but cannot verbalise the rules behind.
 : The author of a book may be justified in believing that all their statements in the book are correct, at the same time believing that at least one of them is incorrect.
 : (Epicurean paradox) The existence of evil seems to be incompatible with the existence of an omnipotent, omniscient, and morally perfect God.
 : Even though rules are intended to determine actions, "no course of action could be determined by a rule, because any course of action can be made out to accord with the rule".
 : White horses are not horses because white and horse refer to different things.
 : "You will never reach point B from point A as you must always get half-way there, and half of the half, and half of that half, and so on..." (This is also a paradox of the infinite)

Mysticism 
 : In Kabbalah, how to reconcile self-awareness of finite Creation with Infinite Divine source, as an emanated causal chain would seemingly nullify existence. Luria's initial withdrawal of God in Hasidic panentheism involves simultaneous illusionism of Creation (Upper Unity) and self-aware existence (Lower Unity), God encompassing logical opposites.

Economics 

One class of paradoxes in economics are the paradoxes of competition, in which behavior that benefits a lone actor would leave everyone worse off if everyone did the same. These paradoxes are classified into circuit, classical and Marx paradoxes.

 : A change in a possible outcome that is shared by different alternatives affects people's choices among those alternatives, in contradiction with expected utility theory.
 : A book arguing that antitrust enforcement artificially raised prices by protecting inefficient competitors from competition.
 : To sell information you need to give it away before the sale.
 : Two players reaching a state of Nash equilibrium both find themselves with no profits gained via exploitation.
 : Adding extra capacity to a network can reduce overall performance.
 : Consumption varies surprisingly smoothly despite sharp variations in income.
 : nations or subpopulations with higher GDP per capita are observed to have fewer children, even though a richer population can support more children.
 : Increasing road capacity at the expense of investments in public transport can make overall congestion on the road worse.
 : For countries with income sufficient to meet basic needs, the reported level of happiness does not correlate with national income per person.
 : With capacity constraints, there may not be an equilibrium.
 : The perceived failure of European countries to translate scientific advances into marketable innovations.
 : Why were interest rates and prices correlated?
 : Increasing the price of bread makes poor people eat more of it.
 : Inability to recoup cost of obtaining market information implies efficient markets cannot exist.
 : Some businesses bring about their own downfall through their own successes.
 : Increases in efficiency lead to even larger increases in demand.
 : Some countries export labor-intensive commodities and import capital-intensive commodities, in contradiction with the Heckscher–Ohlin theorem.
 : The imposition of a tariff on imports may raise the relative world price of that good.
 Louboutin paradox: Paradox of luxury goods. The more expensive some commodity is, the less it is used after acquiring.
 : Capital is not flowing from developed countries to developing countries despite the fact that developing countries have lower levels of capital per worker, and therefore higher returns to capital.
 : Actions that may be vicious to individuals may benefit society as a whole.
 : Keeping everyone out of an information system is impossible, but so is getting everybody in.
 : The imposition of a tariff on imports may reduce the relative internal price of that good.
 : Why do generations that significantly improve the economic climate seem to generally rear a successor generation that consumes rather than produces?
 : If everyone saves more money during times of recession, then aggregate demand will fall and will in turn lower total savings in the population.
 : If everyone tries to work during times of recession, lower wages will reduce prices, leading to more deflationary expectations, leading to further thrift, reducing demand and thereby reducing employment.
 , also known as diamond-water paradox: Water is more useful than diamonds, yet is a lot cheaper.
 : (also known as Solow computer paradox): Worker productivity may go down, despite technological improvements.
 : Using the Kaldor–Hicks criterion, an allocation A may be more efficient than allocation B, while at the same time B is more efficient than A.
 : Successfully fixing a problem with a defective product may lead to higher consumer satisfaction than in the case where no problem occurred at all.
 : People will only offer a modest fee for a reward of infinite expected value.
 : Countries with an abundance of natural resources tend to have less economic growth and worse development outcomes than countries with fewer natural resources.
 : A trader can gain by throwing away some of his/her initial endowment.
 : Bribing politicians costs less than one would expect, considering how much profit it can yield.

Perception 

 : An auditory illusion in which a sequentially played pair of Shepard tones is heard as ascending by some people and as descending by others.
 : Cognitive lock of some experienced programmers that prevents them from properly evaluating the quality of programming languages which they do not know.
 : A visual illusion which suggests inconsistency, such as an impossible cube or the vertical-horizontal illusion, where the two lines are exactly the same length but appear to be of different lengths.

Politics 

 : When two countries each have nuclear weapons, the probability of a direct war between them greatly decreases, but the probability of minor or indirect conflicts between them increases.
 : A person can simultaneously advocate two conflicting policy options, A and B, provided that the person believes that democratic decisions should be followed.

Psychology and sociology  

 : Women conform more closely than men to sociolinguistics norms that are overtly prescribed, but conform less than men when they are not.
 : Countries which promote gender equality tend to have less gender balance in some fields.
 : While many studies suggest IQ to be inheritable to a large degree, the Flynn effect seems to indicate large environmental influence on IQ.
 : Ironic processing is the psychological process whereby an individual's deliberate attempts to suppress or avoid certain thoughts (thought suppression) renders those thoughts more persistent.
 : People care about animals, but embrace diets that involve harming them.
 : A situation in which moral imperatives clash without clear resolution.
 : Schizophrenia patients in developing countries seem to fare better than their Western counterparts.
 : Sometimes, retelling of familiar stories appears to still induce suspense, despite the fact that the audience already knows how the story will unfold.
 : People can sometimes recover more quickly from more intense emotions or pain than from less distressing experiences.
 : The contradictory association whereby higher levels of self-awareness are simultaneously associated with higher levels of psychological distress and with psychological well-being.
 : "The universal aptitude for ineptitude makes any human accomplishment an incredible miracle."
 : Several paradoxes involve the concept of medical or social status.
 : "You must never confuse faith that you will prevail in the end—which you can never afford to lose—with the discipline to confront the most brutal facts of your current reality, whatever they might be."
 : A book arguing that the lack of external persecutions and antagonisms results in the dissolution of Jewish identity, a theory that resonates in works of Dershowitz and Sartre.
 : A book arguing that eliminating consumer choices can greatly reduce anxiety for shoppers.

Miscellaneous 

 : Models or simulations that explain the workings of complex systems are seemingly impossible to construct. As a model of a complex system becomes more complete, it becomes less understandable; for it to be more understandable it must be less complete and therefore less accurate. When the model becomes accurate, it is just as difficult to understand as the real-world processes it represents.
 : Humorous example of a paradox from contradicting proverbs.
 : Many documents contain pages on which the text "This page intentionally left blank" is printed, thereby making the page not blank.
 : Conflicting definitions of what is the best kind of tragedy in Aristotle's Poetics.
 : The outcome of an event or experiment is influenced by the presence of the observer.
 : A paradox in demography in which lessening mortality for a particular cause results in a surprisingly small increase in life expectancy and no change in overall mortality.

See also 

 : A word that is encoded with opposing meanings.
 
 : If a behavior is excusable, it is not negligence.
 : and 
 : To obey this rule, it is necessary to ignore it.
 : A type of optical illusion.
 : An apparently correct mathematical derivation that leads to an obvious contradiction.
 : A misconception resulting from incorrect reasoning in argumentation.
 : A gun that has characteristics of both (smoothbore) shotguns and rifles.
 : Inappropriate laughter, often recognized as such by the laughing person.
 : Some statements contradict the conditions that allow them to be stated.
 
 
 
 : Incongruity theory and the Ridiculous.
Lists of unsolved problems

References 

 
Paradoxes
Articles containing video clips